The 2004 Orlando Predators season was the 14th season for the franchise. They went 10-6 and lost in the Quarterfinals to the Chicago Rush.

Regular season

Schedule

Playoffs

References

External links
2004 Orlando Predators at ArenaFan.com

2004 Arena Football League season
Orlando Predators seasons
2004 in sports in Florida
2000s in Orlando, Florida